Pseudocalamobius okinawanus is a species of beetle in the family Cerambycidae. It was described by Samuelson in 1965.

References

Agapanthiini
Beetles described in 1965